Gilbert Armitage was a British lawyer, critic and journalist who was associated with Percy Wyndham Lewis.

Armitage wrote for the Yorkshire Post in the 1930s where he was a contemporary of Hugh Ross Williamson, Brooke Crutchley, Iverach MacDonald, Charles Davy and Colin Brooks. Among the journals that he contributed to were Scrutiny: A Quarterly Review, Julian Symons' Twentieth Century Verse and the English Review. He was a member of the Whitefriars and Coningsby clubs.

Armitage's Banned in England was inspired by the 1932 trial and conviction of Count Geoffrey Potocki de Montalk for obscenity.

Selected publications
Banned in England: An Examination of the Law Relating to Obscene Publications. London: Wishart, 1932. (Here & Now Pamphlets. No. 7.)
The History of the Bow Street Runners, 1729-1829. London: Wishart, 1932.

References

British lawyers
British male journalists
Year of birth missing
Year of death missing
British critics